Châteaudouble is a commune in the Drôme department in southeastern France. The engineer and sinologist Joseph Charignon was born in Châteaudouble.

Population

See also
Communes of the Drôme department

References

Communes of Drôme